Peter Finch (born 1947) is a Welsh author, psychogeographer and poet living in Cardiff, Wales.

Early life 
Finch was born in Cardiff, Wales, in March 1947, son of Stanley and Marjorie Finch, a post office worker and a telephonist. He attended school in the city and took up his first job as a trainee local government accountant at Glamorgan County Council in 1963.

He began reading and writing poetry after hearing a recording of Allen Ginsberg reading Howl and then buying a copy of the City Lights Edition of this work at Cardiff's SPCK (Society for the Promotion of Christian Knowledge) Bookshop in the Friary. His early work appeared in small magazines such as Poet's Platform, Breakthru and Viewpoints. In 1964 he heard Howlin' Wolf and other performers at the American Negro Blues Festival at Colston Hall, Bristol. There he met the bass player and performer Willie Dixon and tried to interest him in his home grown south Wales blues lyrics. He failed.

Second Aeon 
In 1966 he founded the literary magazine, Second Aeon which ran for 21 issues until 1974. The magazine grew in both content and stature to become the leading alternative lit magazine of the day. Peter Barry called it "The most prominent and best established avant-garde poetry magazine of the period". The magazine generated its own publication series which ran to 80 titles and included works by Peter Redgrove, Kent Taylor, Geraint Jarman, William Wantling, Bob Cobbing, Doug Blazek, D M Thomas and John Tripp. In 1968 Finch founded No Walls, a weekly poetry reading series which ran until 1970. Eighteen issues of the reading series' magazine The No Walls Broadsheet were published. In 1976 at the height of the Poetry Wars he was offered the editorship of the London Poetry Society's The Poetry Review, a post he did not accept.

1970s and experimental poetry 
During the 1970s with Second Aeon magazine at its height Finch became deeply involved with experimental, concrete, sound and visual poetry. He'd met Bob Cobbing in London and had been drawn to the innovative often anarchic styles practised in the capital. He became treasurer of the Association of Little Presses (ALP), the Welsh representative of Poet's Conference, the poets trade union, and a council member of the Poetry Society in Earl's Court.

In Wales he had been elected a member of the English Section of Yr Academi Gymreig, the Welsh Academy, the august association of writers, and was regarded by some as its an enfant terrible.

His work, often in the form of extended sound poetry innovations, was performed at venues throughout the UK. His visual poetry was exhibited in the company of that of Peter Mayer, dsh, Cobbing and others both in the UK and further afield. He was awarded a Welsh Arts Council bursary for visual poetry. The University of California exhibited both his concrete poetry and Second Aeon magazine artefacts.

Richard Kostelanetz called him "the principal innovator in Welsh poetry... Finch has favored a variety of tight sober structures, including parodies of other poets, visual poems, sound poems, and verbal imitations of Philip Glass' music... Finch deserves a Welsh knighthood".

The Oriel bookshop – 1973–1998 
Following his appointment in 1973 Finch managed the Welsh Arts Council's Oriel bookshop, a specialist bilingual (English and Welsh) arts and poetry retailer for twenty-five years. This included the original first floor operation in Charles Street, Cardiff until 1989, the more commercial shop on the ground floor at The Friary until 1997 and, briefly, as manager of the HMSO Oriel take-over until 1998. The shop became a centre for writers, small publishers, innovators, poets and performers. It was a home to Welsh-language culture in the capital as well as a venue for numerous poetry readings and other literary events. Everyone from R. S. Thomas to Lawrence Ferlinghetti, Jackson Mac Low to Simon Armitage and Margaret Atwood to Derek Walcott read at the premises. The ALP mounted bookfairs. Writers groups gathered.

How to get published 
Informed by his experience as a magazine editor, a performing and published poet and then a bookseller Finch wrote and published a number of highly successful guides. His Getting Your Poetry Published, first brought out by the Association of Little Presses in 1973, ran to 15 editions with many thousands of copies in print. His How to Publish Your Poetry (Allison & Busby, 1985), How to Publish Yourself (Allison & Busby, 1987) and The Poetry Business (Seren, 1994) all ran to multiple editions. Between 1989 and 2007 he compiled the poetry section for Macmillan's trade guidebook The Writer's Handbook. Between 1990 and 2018 he compiled the self publishing section for A&C Black's Artists' and Writers' Yearbook.

 1980s and performance poetry 
During the 1980s, and with a background in sonic innovation and the stretching of the poetry voice, Finch was at the forefront of the emerging performance poetry scene. Following on from the founding work of poet Chris Torrance he joined Cabaret 246 and then, with poets Topher Mills and Ifor Thomas, the trio Horses Mouth. The work here involved innovative use of props and owed as much to theatre as it did to traditional literary performance. The need to entertain became a driver.

 Academi and Literature Wales 
In 1998 he left the Oriel Bookshop to head Academi, the new Welsh National Literature Promotion Agency and Society of Writers developed from the old Welsh Academy (Yr Academi Gymreig) and funded by the Welsh Government. This organisation had the job of promoting and developing literature throughout the country. Finch considerably expanded bursary provision, visits of writers to schools, prisons, and deprived communities, literary tours, readings, festivals and other provisions. At the Wales Millennium Centre he created the Glyn Jones Centre. This was a writer's library and drop-in advice centre developed with a legacy from the great Anglo-Welsh writer. He put the annual Wales Book of the Year prize onto a visible and celebratory footing; created the role of Welsh National Poet; and helped smooth the way for innovations such as the poet Gwyneth Lewis' bilingual words built across the frontage of the Wales Millennium Centre. In 2001 he guest edited a Welsh edition of the US magazine Slope which provided a bi-lingual snapshot of just what was happening in poetry in Wales at the turn of the Millennium.

 Later life and work 
In the new millennium Finch worked on psychogeographies and alternative guides to his native city of Cardiff. His first book of this genre, Real Cardiff, which appeared in 2002 was successful enough to generate three follow ups and a whole series of Real books covering mainly conurbations throughout the UK. These are written by a range of authors (including Grahame Davies and Patrick McGuinness). There are 25 in the series to date. Finch acts as series editor. Finch has also written on popular music (The Roots of Rock – 2016), the Severn Estuary (Edging the Estuary – 2013) and has produced innovative walking guides to both Cardiff and its valleys with the photographer John Briggs.

In 2022 with the assistance of editor Andrew Taylor he published two volumes comprising 1,000 pages of his Collected Poems. These books have been well received. He has recently published a new chapbook of 14 poems, Just When You Think It's Over – It Starts Again with the small diy, punk, handmade publisher in New Jersey, Between Shadows Press.

 Work in the public realm 
Finch has four pieces associated with public artworks on show in the built environment of Cardiff. These include Ysbwriel (2002) as part of Jeroen Van Western's Breathing In Time Out across the top of the Lamby Way landfill site; sections of R S Thomas Information (2003) which have been incorporated onto the exterior and interior of the BT Internet Data Centre in Cardiff Bay; L'Alliance (2010) as part of Jean-Bernard Metais public artwork in The Hayes, Cardiff; and The Ballast Bank (2011) as part of Renn & Thacker's The Blue Light'' outside Butetown Police Station in Cardiff Bay.

Bibliography

References

1947 births
Living people
Welsh poets
British Poetry Revival
Writers from Cardiff